Sun Valley is a census-designated place in NW Chestnuthill Township, Monroe County, Pennsylvania on the west side of Route 115 and the south flank of Pohopoco Mountain. The Pohopoco Creek starts in Sun Valley and flows south to Gilbert then west to Beltzville Lake and the Lehigh River. New Jersey Camp Jaycee for people with special needs is located in the CDP, which uses the Effort zip code of 18330.   As of the 2010 census the population was 2,399 residents.

References

External links
New Jersey Camp Jaycee

Census-designated places in Pennsylvania
Census-designated places in Monroe County, Pennsylvania